Mustafa I (1786–1837), commonly known as Mustapha Bey, was the ninth leader of the Husainid Dynasty and the ruler of Tunisia from 1835 until his death in 1837.

References

1786 births
1837 deaths
Beys of Tunis
Tunisian royalty